Uijong of Goryeo (23 May 1127 – 7 November 1173) (r. 1146–1170) was the 18th monarch of the Goryeo dynasty of Korea. He honored his advisors with many ceremonies but hated the warriors, often forcing them to participate in martial arts competitions for the entertainment of himself and the civil officials, as well as assigning them petty portions during land distributions. He also was often drunk, further angering the warriors. Finally, in the autumn of 1170, after constant discriminations, the rage of the military officials burst. Three warriors (Jeong Jung-bu, Yi Ui-bang, Yi Go) and others, started a military revolt, murdering the civil officials, deposing King Uijong, and appointing a new king in his place.

Family
Father: Injong of Goryeo (고려 인종)
Grandfather: Yejong of Goryeo (고려 예종)
Grandmother:  Queen Sundeok (순덕왕후)
Mother: Queen Gongye (공예왕후)
Grandfather: Im Won-hu (임원후)
Grandmother: Grand Lady of Jinhan State of the Bupyeong Yi clan (진한국대부인 부평 이씨)
Consorts and their Respective issue(s):
Queen Janggyeong of the Gim clan (장경왕후 김씨); half second cousin once removed.
Wang Gi, Crown Prince Hyoryeong (왕기 효령태자)
Princess Gyeongdeok (경덕궁주)
Princess Anjeong (안정궁주)
Princess Hwasun (화순궁주)
Queen Jangseon of the Jiksan Choe clan (장선왕후 최씨); maternal first cousin – No issue.
Concubine Mubi (무비)
Little Prince Wang (소군 왕씨)
Little Prince Wang (소군 왕씨)
Little Prince Wang (소군 왕씨)
Royal Lady Wang (왕녀 왕씨)
Royal Lady Wang (왕녀 왕씨)
Royal Lady Wang (왕녀 왕씨)
Royal Lady Wang (왕녀 왕씨)
Royal Lady Wang (왕녀 왕씨)
Royal Lady Wang (왕녀 왕씨)
Royal Lady Wang (왕녀 왕씨)
Royal Lady Wang (왕녀 왕씨)
Royal Lady Wang (왕녀 왕씨)

Popular culture
 Portrayed by Kim Kyu-chul in the 2003-2004 KBS TV series Age of Warriors.

References

 

1127 births
1173 deaths
Leaders ousted by a coup
12th-century Korean monarchs
Goryeo Buddhists
People from Kaesong